Asociación Deportiva Municipal Liberia  is a Costa Rican football team playing in the Liga FPD. The team is based in Liberia, Guanacaste.  Their home stadium is the Estadio Edgardo Baltodano Briceño.

History
Founded on 7 June 1977, four years after Guanacasteca was founded and solely represented Guanacaste Province, Municipal Liberia won promotion to the Primera División de Costa Rica in 2001 after beating Ramonense in a Promotion play-off final. They made their debut in the top tier on 29 July 2001 against Saprissa.

Liberia Mía
In June 2007, the club was bought largely (90% of the shares) by Mario Sotela (linked to the Sotela-blen family) and were renamed Liberia Mía (My Liberia) after a Sotela project located in Liberia that is called "Zoológico África Mía" (it is a special zoo based only on African animals and species).

Águilas Guanacastecas and relegation
In 2009, Liberia Mía won the Verano championship title, but it proved to be a short-lived party when in July 2010, the club just renamed again to Águilas Guanacastecas (Guanacastecan Eagles), were demoted to the Segunda División de Costa Rica after trading franchise rights with Barrio México.  The move was regarded by some as controversial since Barrio México club president Mínor Vargas was allegedly also involved with Liberia. Also, it was the second time a Guanacaste team was sold and moved outside the province after Guanacasteca's franchise was taken by Brujas de Escazú in 2004.

Municipal Liberia again
In summer 2011, after Barrio México was expelled from the Primera División, Liberia played in the second division as Los Coyotes del Municipal Liberia, replacing AD Desamparados whose franchise was bought by Liberia's new owner Manrique Sibaja. The club has been playing in the second division ever since.

In February 2015, Uruguayan coach Orlando de León took charge, replacing Slovak Josef Miso after some poor performances.

Honours

National
Primera División de Costa Rica
 Winners (1): Verano 2009.

Segunda División de Costa Rica
 Winners (1): 2000–01

Costa Rican Third Division
 Winners (1): 1985

Stadium

The stadium is owned by the Municipality of Liberia and is used by the Liberia Municipal team of the Costa Rican First Division.  It has a natural field and has capacity for 4,500 people according to the Costa Rican emergency commission.

The first match was between AD Guanacasteca and the team from Limón FC.  As a curious fact, at that time they asked AD Guanacasteca to inaugurate it in a Costa Rican First Division game, given that the game they had to play on that date was a visitor against Limón FC and the Caribbeans were asked to agree play in the White City;  this is how that day, Limón FC was local in Liberia against Guanacasteca.  The final result was tied at one goal. 

The stadium was subjected to intense improvement work, both in its infrastructure and in its natural grass, starting in 2013, due to the fact that it is a venue for the Women's World Cup of Sub-Soccer. 17, and was approved by FIFA so that people enjoy the games they are going to see in the Liberian venue.

Current squad
As of February 2, 2023

Championship Verano 2009
List of players and coaching staff who achieved the 2009 summer championship of the National Soccer Costa Rican First Division under the name of Liberia Mia on May 26, 2009.

Couching Staff

Technical director= Alain Gay-Hardy

Goalkeepers= Alejandro Bonilla

Physiotherapist= Cristian Cubillo

Physical trainer= Guillermo Zamora

Masseurs= Kenier Mora & Marvin Miranda

Props= Carlos Baltodano & Royner Mora

References

Football clubs in Costa Rica
Association football clubs established in 1977